When __ Ruled the World is a television series on VH1 that covers pop culture history.

Episode list
Supermodels
Metal
Rated X
Stand-Up Comics
Disco
Playboy
Kiss
The Partridge Family
Star Wars
Melrose Place
Metallica
Jerry Springer

External links 
 

2000s American documentary television series
2003 American television series debuts
2003 American television series endings
VH1 original programming